Martti Lautala (11 November 1928 – 5 November 2016) was a Finnish former cross-country skier who competed in the 1950s. He won a bronze medal in the 30 km event at the 1954 FIS Nordic World Ski Championships in Falun.

Cross-country skiing results
All results are sourced from the International Ski Federation (FIS).

World Championships
1 medal – (1 bronze)

References

External links

1928 births
2016 deaths
Finnish male cross-country skiers
FIS Nordic World Ski Championships medalists in cross-country skiing
20th-century Finnish people